Haplogroup BT M91, also known as Haplogroup A1b2 (and formerly as A4, BR and BCDEF), is a Y-chromosome haplogroup. BT is a subclade of haplogroup A1b (P108) and a sibling of the haplogroup A1b1 (L419/PF712).

Distribution
Basal BT* has not been documented in any living individuals or ancient remains. Later Stone Age individuals excavated at Fingira Rock, Malawi, dated to around 6100 years ago (2/2 males), and at Mount Hora, Malawi, dated to around 8000 years ago (1/1 males), all belonged to Y haplogroup BT(xCT) (i.e. they did not belong to haplogroup CT but may have belonged to haplogroup B).

No definite examples of BT(xCF,DE) – i.e. members of BT outside the only two known branches of CT, namely haplogroups CF and DE – have been identified. In some cases, because testing is undertaken only for geographically and historically likely haplogroups, the data required to identify a precise subclade has not been collected and/or recorded. For instance, research published in 2013, regarding a sample of more than 2,000 men from different parts of Africa, included 7.5% belonging to haplogroup BT(xDE,K). These approximately 150 individuals may have included, for example: B*, unknown primary branches of haplogroups B, BT, CT or CF; haplogroup C, and/or; F(xK) (i.e. haplogroup F* plus its subclades G, H and IJ, but specifically excluding the broader haplogroup K and its subclades, such as haplogroups K*, LT, K2b*, MS, NO, P, Q and R).

Phylogenetics
The ISOGG tree since 2014 has treated M91  as the defining mutation of BT.

B M60, M181, P85, P90
CT P9.1, M168, M294

Prior to 2002, there were in academic literature at least seven naming systems for the Y-Chromosome Phylogenetic tree. This led to considerable confusion. In 2002, the major research groups came together and formed the Y-Chromosome Consortium (YCC). They published a joint paper that created a single new tree that all agreed to use.

See also

References

B-M42